Cheers is a 1982-1993 American television sitcom.

Cheers or CHEERS may also refer to:

 "Cheers", a toast given as a social drinking ritual

Arts, entertainment, and media

Music
 The Cheers, an American vocal group in the 1950s

Albums
 Cheers (Obie Trice album), 2003 
 Cheers (Lee Hong-gi album), 2018
 Cheers, by Burl Ives, 1959
 Cheers, by Jukebox the Ghost, 2022
 Cheers, by The Wild Reeds, 2019

Songs
 "Cheers (Drink to That)", by Rihanna, 2011
 "Cheers", by Obie Trice, from the album of the same name
 "Cheers", by Sevendust from All I See Is War, 2018
 "Cheers", by Sleeping with Sirens from Gossip, 2017
 "Cheers", a 2020 song by Blackbear and Wiz Khalifa

Television
 Cheers (Spanish TV series), a 2011 remake of the American series

Other uses
 Cheers Beacon Hill, formerly the Bull & Finch Pub, a bar in Boston, Massachusetts, used for exterior shots of the sitcom bar
 Cheers (proa), a Polynesian-inspired sailboat designed by Dick Newick in 1967
 Children's Environmental Exposure Research Study (CHEERS)

See also 
 
 
 Cheer (disambiguation)
 Cheering